Michael Davis (1875 – 30 March 1944) was an Irish Cumann na nGaedheal and later Fine Gael politician. He was first elected to Dáil Éireann as a Cumann na nGaedheal Teachta Dála (TD) for the Mayo North constituency at the June 1927 general election. He was re-elected at each subsequent general election until he retired from politics at the 1937 general election.

References

1875 births
1944 deaths
Cumann na nGaedheal TDs
Fine Gael TDs
Members of the 5th Dáil
Members of the 6th Dáil
Members of the 7th Dáil
Members of the 8th Dáil
Politicians from County Mayo